No Love Boulevard is the twenty-first studio album by American rapper Z-Ro, which was released June 30, 2017 under 1 Deep Entertainment and was distributed by Empire. This album was believed to be the last album by the American rapper when he announced his retirement to the Houston Press.

Track listing

Charts

References 

2017 albums
Z-Ro albums